The ABSA Cup, formerly the Barclays Cup, is the current branding for an association football cup competition launched in 2007 by the Football Association of Zambia.

Participants are decided half-way through current season (match day 17) and are picked from the two highest divisions in Zambia. Since the inaugural season of National Division One in the 2019–20 season, 2 teams are picked from the that division and 6 are from the Super League to enter the competition each year.

Following the full acquisition of the assets and operations of Barclays in Africa, including Zambia, by South Africa-based ABSA (now Absa Group Limited) in 2018, the competition's next edition in 2019 was rebranded as the Absa Cup.

Winners

References

Football competitions in Zambia